Geronimo Ybarra was  a member of the Los Angeles Common Council, the governing body of that city, in 1859–60. On May 12, 1857, he was elected second lieutenant in a volunteer military organization, Lanceros de Los Angeles, with Juan Sepulveda as captain.

References

Los Angeles Common Council (1850–1889) members
19th-century American politicians
Year of birth missing
Year of death missing
People of Mexican California